Trott may refer to:

 Abby Trott, American voice actress
 Albert Trott (1873–1914), Australian-born Test cricketer for both Australia and England
 Benjamin Trott (born 1977), American blogger and businessman
 Christopher Trott (born 1988), English YouTuber and musician
 Dave Trott, American Congressional representative from Michigan
 Emma Trott (born 1989), British road and track cyclist
 Harry Trott (1866–1917), Australian Test cricketer
 Jonathan Trott (born 1981), English cricketer
Josephine Trott (1874–1950), composer
 Laura Trott (born 1992), British track cyclist
 Mena Grabowski Trott (born 1977), American blogger and businesswoman
 Novella Jewell Trott (1846–1929), American author and editor
 Stephen S. Trott (born 1939), American judge
 Stuart Trott (born 1948), Australian rules footballer
 Thomas Trott (1483–1524?), English politician